Usha Kiran (22 April 1929 – 9 March 2000) was an Indian actress. In a career spanning over four decades, she acted in over 50 Hindi and Marathi films, notably Daag (1952), Patita (1953), Baadbaan (1954), Chupke Chupke (1975), Mili (1975) and Bawarchi (1972). She was also the Sheriff of Mumbai during 1996 and 1997.

Career
She began her acting career on stage with M.G. Rangnekar's Marathi play Ashirwad. She entered the Hindi film industry with a small role in Uday Shankar's dance-drama film Kalpana (1948). She went on to act in numerous popular Hindi films such as Nazrana (1961), Daag (1952), and Baadbaan (1954), (for which she won the very first Filmfare Award for Best Supporting Actress in 1955), Kabuliwala (1961), Patita (1953), Mili, Bawarchi (1972) and Chupke Chupke (1975).

Her famous Marathi films include Shikleli Bayko,  Jasach Tase, Postatli Mulgi, Dudh Bhakar, Stree Janma Hi Tuzi Kahani, Kanyadaan (for which she received the Maharashtra Government's award for best actress), Gariba Gharchi Lek, and Kanchanganga.

She starred opposite Hindi film actors such as Kishore Kumar, Raj Kapoor, Dev Anand, Ashok Kumar, Dilip Kumar, Rajendra Kumar, Rajesh Khanna, Dharmendra and Amitabh Bachchan.

She died in Nashik at the age of 70.

Personal life
Usha was born into a Marathi-speaking family as Usha Balkrishna Marathe, daughter of Balkrishna Vishnu Marathe and his wife Radhabai Marathe. She was the second among five daughters. She was married to Dr. Manohar Kher, who became Dean of Sion Hospital in Mumbai. They were the parents of two children, a son, Advait Kher and a daughter, Tanvi Azmi. Usha Kiran's son Advait is a former model, now settled in Nashik with his wife Uttara (who was Femina Miss India of 1982) and his two daughters Saunskruti Kher and Saiyami Kher. Usha Kiran's daughter Tanvi Azmi is a well known television and film actress, married to cinematographer Baba Azmi, brother of Shabana Azmi.

Selected filmography

 Kalpana (1948)
 Garibi (1949)
 Shri Krishna Darshan (1950)
 Raj Rani (1950)
 Gauna (1950)
 Bhagwan Shri Krishna (1950)
 Shri Vishnu Bhagwan (1951)
 Sarkar (1951)
 Maya Machhindra (1951)
 Madhosh (1951) - Raina
 Mard Maratha (1952)
 Lal Kunwar (1952)
 Dhobi Doctor (1952)
 Daag (1952) - Pushpa 'Pushpi'
 Patita (1953) - Radha
 Husn Ka Chor (1953)
 Dhuaan (1953)
 Dost (1954)
 Aulad (1954)
 Shobha (1954)
 Samaj (1954)
 Badshah (1954)
 Baadbaan (1954)
 Adhikar (1954) - Usha
 Oot Patang (1955)
 Bahu (1955)
 Guru Ghantal (1956)
 Parivar (1956)
 Ayodhyapati (1956)
 Anuraag (1956)
 Aawaz (1956) - Bela
 Raja Vikram (1957)
 Musafir (1957) - Uma
 Jeevan Saathi (1957)
 Dushman (1957) - Sheela
 Trolley Driver (1958)
 Shikleli Baiko (1959)
 Saata Janmachi Sobti (1959) - Pramila Jadhav / Pramila M. Mohite
 Mehndi Rang Lagyo (1960) - Alka
 Kanyadaan (1960)
 Dil Bhi Tera Hum Bhi Tere (1960) - Prema
 Kabuliwala (1961) - Rama, Mini's mother
 Tanhai (1961)
 Nazrana (1961) - Geeta
 Mansala Pankh Astat (1961)
 Amrit Manthan (1961)
 Gharni Shobha (1963)
 Gehra Daag (1963) - Usha
 Bawarchi (1972) - Shobha Sharma
 Badi Maa (1974)
 Chupke Chupke (1975) - Sumitra Sharma
 Mili (1975) - Sharda Khanna
 Lage Bandhe (1979)
 Fatakadi (1980) - Laxmi Narayan
 Chambal Ki Kasam (1980) - Jamuna Devi
 Samraat (1982) - Mrs. Chawla
 Mehndi (1983) - Gautam's mom
 Bahurani (1989) - Mrs. Laxmi Chaudhary (Amit's Mom) (uncredited)

References

External links
 

Indian film actresses
Actresses in Hindi cinema
1929 births
2000 deaths
20th-century Indian actresses
Actresses from Mumbai
Actresses in Marathi cinema
Sheriffs of Mumbai
Filmfare Awards winners